Dongfengnanlu is a metro station of Zhengzhou Metro Line 1.

Station layout 
The 2-level underground station has a single island platform for Line 1. The B1 level is for the station concourse and the B2 level is for the platforms.

Exits

The station currently has 4 exits. Exit A, B and C are on the west side of Dongfeng South Road. Since there are many business and residential buildings on the opposite side, Exit D has been built on the east side of Dongfeng South Road.

References

Stations of Zhengzhou Metro
Line 1, Zhengzhou Metro
Railway stations in China opened in 2013